Darby FC is a Canadian semi-professional soccer club based in Whitby, Ontario and Clarington, Ontario. The club was founded in 2015 to compete in League1 Ontario.  The club was formed as a partnership between two local area youth clubs - Whitby SC and Darlington SC.  It fields teams in both the men's and women's divisions of League1 Ontario.

Founders
The club was founded in 2015 as a joint partnership between Durham Region clubs Darlington Soccer Club and Whitby Soccer Club with the name Darby coming from name blending the two names.

Darlington SC

Darlington Soccer Club is a youth soccer club from the municipality of Clarington. Its roots date back to the foundation of the Darlington Soccer League founded in 1880; which is argued to be the oldest in Canada.

Whitby FC
Whitby FC is a youth soccer club in Whitby, Ontario. It was founded in 1966 as the Whitby Iroquois SC. In 2016, the club rebranded as Whitby FC with a new logo.

History
The club's first team entered the women's division of League1 Ontario in 2016. Their inaugural game resulted in a 1–1 draw with North Mississauga SC. They finished their debut season in eighth place, out of nine clubs.

In 2018, Darby added their men's team to the  men's league, which is one division below the top-tier Canadian Premier League. Many of the players on their inaugural roster came from the prior year's Durham United FA roster, as Durham did not enter a team for the 2018 season. Their debut match on April 28, 2018 was against the Woodbridge Strikers and resulted in a 1–1 draw.

Seasons

Men

Women

Notable former players
The following players have either played at the professional or international level, either before or after playing for the League1 Ontario team:

Men

Women

References

Association football clubs established in 2015
Soccer clubs in Ontario
League1 Ontario teams
2015 establishments in Ontario
Sport in Whitby, Ontario